Rome Adventure, also known as Lovers Must Learn, is a 1962 romantic drama film, based on the 1932 novel Lovers Must Learn by Irving Fineman. It was directed by Delmer Daves and stars Troy Donahue, Angie Dickinson, and Suzanne Pleshette.

Plot
After quitting her job as school librarian, Prudence Bell (Suzanne Pleshette) leaves New England for a vacation in Rome. On the boat over, she befriends Roberto Orlandi (Rossano Brazzi), a philandering middle-aged Italian who upon their arrival in Rome introduces her to a countess who rents out rooms in her villa to tourists. Once Prudence settles in, she finds employment at an American bookstore and later encounters handsome architectural student Don Porter (Troy Donahue), one of several Americans also rooming at the villa. Don, who is recovering from a failed relationship with a blonde temptress named Lyda (Angie Dickinson), keeps his distance at first. But he slowly looks on Prudence as a refreshing curiosity with her adventurous outlook on life.

Weeks later, Don and Prudence tour the garden spots of northern Italy. But upon their return to Rome, Prudence meets Don's old flame Lyda, who has recently become embroiled in an abusive relationship with a cruel, possessive Italian industrialist. It is obvious Lyda wants to rekindle her affair with Don when she trades insults with Prudence at dinner one evening. Not hearing from Don for three days after, Prudence assumes Lyda has won Don back, and she decides to move on. She consents to sex with Roberto, the aggressive Italian she first met on the boat over. But Roberto reveals to her that Don had stayed with him (and not Lyda) the previous three days in order to think things through. Don had told Roberto of his love for Prudence, but he then received an urgent telegram from Lyda, summoning him to a hotel. After hearing this, Prudence makes plans for her return to America.

Cut to Don arriving at the hotel, where Lyda confesses she married the industrialist for money and position only. She begs Don to help free her from her palatial prison. Realizing Lyda plans to use him for selfish ends, Don bolts for Rome. But on his arrival, he discovers Prudence has taken a ship back to the States. Days later, arriving in New York City's port, Prudence finds Don there to greet her. They embrace as he tells her of his love and asks her to marry him.

Cast
 Troy Donahue  as Don Porter
 Angie Dickinson as Lyda Kent
 Rossano Brazzi as Roberto Orlandi
 Suzanne Pleshette as Prudence Bell
 Constance Ford as Daisy Bronson
 Al Hirt as himself
 Hampton Fancher as Albert Stillwell
 Iphigenie Castiglioni as La Contessa
 Chad Everett as Young man
 Gertrude Flynn as Mrs. Riggs
 Pamela Austin as Agnes Hutton
 Lili Valenty as Angelina
 Emilio Pericoli as Italian singer

Background
Lovers Must Learn was published in 1932. The New York Times called it a "workmanlike production". Unlike the film, the novel was set in Paris.

Delmer Daves purchased the rights to the novel in 1957 and announced plans to make a film version in France, Copenhagen and Switzerland.

Natalie Wood was at one stage announced for the lead. Troy Donahue was announced for the male lead relatively early. Eventually Natalie Wood dropped out and Suzanne Pleshette was signed in September 1961.

The film was known during production as Lovers Must Learn. Donahue and Pleshette fell in love while filming, and eventually wed, though the marriage lasted less than a year.

The song "Al di là" featured in the film and performed by Emilio Pericoli was originally recorded by Betty Curtis and Luciano Tajoli and winner of the 1961 edition of the Sanremo Festival, subsequently becoming Italy's entry to the Eurovision Song Contest 1961. The song became an international hit with a cover version by Connie Francis.

Most of the interior scenes were shot at Warner Bros, Burbank. The Library and Port of Entry sets were originally constructed for the film The Music Man (1962).

Soundtrack
"Rome Adventure"
"Lovers Must Learn"
"Tarantella"
"Al Di La"
"Serenade"
"Prudence"
"Rome Adeventure"
"Oh Marie"
"Mattinata"
"Arrivederci Roma"
"Come Back to Sorrento"
"Santa Lucia"
"Volare"

See also
 List of American films of 1962

References

External links
 
 
 
 
  ("Al di là")

1962 romantic drama films
1962 films
American romantic drama films
1960s English-language films
Films based on American novels
Films directed by Delmer Daves
Films scored by Max Steiner
Films set in Italy
Films set in Rome
Films shot in Italy
Warner Bros. films
1960s American films